John Adam (March 7, 1860–?) was an American brewer from Milwaukee who served one term as a People's Party member of the Wisconsin State Assembly.

Background 
Adam was born in Dienheim, Hesse-Darmstadt, German Confederation, on March 7, 1860; received a common school in Germany and came to Wisconsin in 1874, and settled at Milwaukee, where he continued his education and resided. He became a brewer.

Elective office 
Adam was "master workman" of the Gambrinus assembly of the Knights of Labor, but had held no public office until elected to the Assembly in 1886 from the 10th Milwaukee County Assembly district (the 10th Ward of the City of Milwaukee) to succeed Republican Charles Elkert (who was not a candidate for re-election) for the session of 1887. Adam won 1,184 votes to 563 for Republican August Ruggaber and 305 votes for Democrat Charles Nolte. He did not run for re-election in 1888, and was succeeded by Elkert.

References 

Hessian emigrants to the United States
Members of the Wisconsin State Assembly
Politicians from Milwaukee
People from Rhenish Hesse
Wisconsin Laborites
American brewers
1860 births
Year of death missing
Place of death missing
American trade union leaders
Knights of Labor people